Chen Guangfu may refer to:

Kwang Pu Chen (1880–1976), Chinese banker
Chen Kuang-fu (born 1955), Taiwanese politician